Henry Carroll may refer to:
Henry Carroll (general) (1836–1908), American brigadier general
Henry Carroll (soccer) (1909–1999), American soccer player
Henry George Carroll (1865–1939), Canadian politician
Henry Nelson Carroll (1937–2015), Canadian lawyer and politician
Henry L. Carroll (born 1947), American racehorse trainer
Henry Carroll (lawyer) (1772–1820), American lawyer and statesman